Robinson 2020, also known as Robinson Fiji, was the eighteenth season of Swedish Expedition Robinson franchise. 23 contestants from all over Sweden travelled to Fiji to compete in challenges, until the two teams merged into one. After the teams merged, the contestants competed in individual challenges, hoping to win immunity to be safe from being voted out. Once three remained, they competed in a series of challenges in order to determine this year's Robinson winner. The season premiered on 15 March 2020 and ended on 24 May 2020, and was broadcast on TV4. The presenter was Anders Öfvergård. This year's winner was Michael Björklund who earned 500,000 SEK.

Season Summary 
Team South was plagued by conflict centered around Raymond, a muscular man who wanted to dominate everything. He bullied two of the team members and people grew afraid of him to the extent that they joined him in the bullying. He garnered almost a cult-like following. Those who opposed him were voted out. It took two simultaneous twists to vote him out just before the merge. Michael was the team's chef. No one had problems with him because he stayed out of the conflicts and never spoke up against the bullying. He later revealed that he was previously Sweden's Chef of the Year and had competed in the cooking world cup.
In Team North, two physically strong men (Jonas and Hasse) took leader roles. A pact of weaker players led by Julia voted them out to save themselves.
The teams merged 5-4 but three wild cards (Christoffer, Clara and Jani) joined just before the merge, adding complexity. One player flipped in each direction (Ragnar and Mattias). All three wild cards joined Julia's Team North alliance. Because of his strong relationship with the three wild cards, spiritual man Kristove took over leadership of Julia's alliance and pulled the strings. Their alliance was in a comfortable majority. Every single player joined either alliance, a rare occurrence in Swedish Survivor.
In a twist where two players would be voted out in one vote, both alliances inevitably got to pick off one opponent, which ended Mattias' game. At Gränslandet ("The Borderlands"), Jonas had stayed alive ever since he was voted out but he was defeated by Mattias who returned to the game.
Because two of the wild cards (Chistoffer and Clara) were sway votes, some members of Kristove's alliance feared that they would flip but that never happened and the alliance held strong until the final eight where knock-out challenges began. Christoffer was clearly the biggest physical threat and Mattias was the one most likely to beat him. However, Clara, the other wild card, won plankan and Mattias was voted out in the final five. Michael voted for Mattias even though Christoffer was the biggest challenge threat because Christoffer had helped Michael in the previous challenge. Then the jury got to remove yet another player and chose Christoffer. He never made any trouble and got along with everyone but the jury didn't like that he was a wild card who joined at the merge and if they didn't vote him out, the was favored to win. All but one jury member voted for Christoffer to leave.
The final multi-stage obstacle course was contested by Michael, Clara and Priya, an under-the-radar player. Michael was the only surviving member of the Team South alliance. He had flown under the radar the whole game and was the lowest-priority player to vote off. Being overweight, no one expected him to be a threat in the knock-out challenges anyway. Although he was helped by Christoffer in a math challenge, he did survive one challenge on his own merit and most importantly, he put off a stable performance in every part of the final multi-stage obstacle course, especially in the throwing and fire-making parts, and he won it by a comfortable margin.

Contestants

References

External links

Expedition Robinson Sweden seasons
2020 Swedish television seasons